Pulpwood is timber with the principal use of making wood pulp for paper production.

Applications

 Trees raised specifically for pulp production account for 15% of world pulp production, old growth forests 9% and second- and third- and more generation forests account for the balance. Reforestation is practiced in most areas, so trees are a renewable resource.
 Pulpwood is also used as the raw material for some wood products, such as oriented strand board (OSB). 
 There is an increasing demand for pulpwood as a source of bio-energy for burning and baking into charcoal.

Properties
The fiber length of the cellulose fiber is the most important parameter of the pulpwood and determines what it may be used for. The first separation is into softwood and hardwood, that have long and short fibers respectively. In paper production fiber from softwood give tensile strength and fibers from hardwood give opacity.

Sources

Logging
In the logging of mixed forest stands, the better trees are usually used for sawlogs for lumber production, while the inferior trees and components are harvested for pulpwood production. Pulpwood usually derives from four types of woody materials in a mixed logging operation:
 Open-grown trees, that are heavily branched low on the trunk, and so make poor sawlogs.
 Dead or diseased trees.
 Tops cut from trees harvested for sawlogs (branches are rarely used since they contain little usable wood after the bark has been removed).
 Small trees, too small to harvest for sawlogs.

Natural forest stands may also be harvested solely for pulpwood where, for various reasons, the value of the trees as sawlogs is low. This may be due to the predominant species in the forest stand (for example, some aspen forests in northern North America), or to the relative proximity of the nearest sawmill or pulp mill.

Plantations
Pulpwood is also harvested from tree farms established for the specific purpose of growing pulpwood, with little or minimal sawlog production. Monoculture of species intended specifically for pulpwood include loblolly and slash pines in the southern USA; various species of eucalyptus (most commonly Eucalyptus globulus and Eucalyptus grandis) in Latin America, Iberian Peninsula, Australia, south-east Asia and southern Africa and acacia (most commonly Acacia mangium) in south-east Asia and southern Africa.

Salvage cuttings
Salvage cuts after forest fires, tornadoes, hurricanes, or other natural disasters are often used for pulpwood. An alternative source of wood for use in Kraft pulping is recovered lumber from demolition, industrial processing of wood and wooden pallets.

Wood residuals
Saw residuals are used as pulp wood. The most important of these are the side cuttings from lumber edger. This gives wood with almost only sapwood and no heartwood. The sapwood is easier to pulp. due to a more open structure and less content of extractive than the heartwood. The fiber length of sapwood is generally longer than the fiber length of heartwood. The sapwood is also normally lighter and that is an advantage when producing mechanical pulp as less bleaching of wood pulp is needed.

Earlier sawdust had some limited use in paper production. It gives very short fibers that are suitable as part of the furnish for paper tissue and writing papers. Saw blades have become thinner and with smaller teeth making the sawdust too small as fiber source.

Pulpwoods

Economically important pulpwoods
 Hardwoods
Acacia
Aspen
Birch
Eucalyptus
Maple
Pacific Albus and Rubber tree
 Softwoods
Pine
Spruce

Chemical composition of some pulpwoods

Alternatives
Sugar cane byproducts and bamboo are used in the commercial production of toilet paper.

See also
 Paper pulp
 Pulp mill
 Paper machine
 Woodchips

References

Papermaking
Forestry
Pulp and paper industry

no:Massevirke
vi:Bột giấy